Janier Concepción Hernández (born 6 September 1985) is a Cuban former rower who competed at the 2008 Summer Olympics.

Biography
Concepción, who comes from Sancti Spíritus, earned two gold medals at the 2007 Pan American Games in Rio de Janeiro, winning the doubles sculls and quadruple sculls events. It was in quadruple sculls that he represented Cuba at the 2008 Beijing Olympics, teamed up with Yuleidys Cascaret, Ángel Fournier and Yoennis Hernández. They made it to the B final and finished in 12 position overall. He appeared at the World Rowing Championships four times during his career.

References

External links
Janier Concepción at Sports Reference

1985 births
Living people
Cuban male rowers
Olympic rowers of Cuba
Rowers at the 2008 Summer Olympics
Pan American Games gold medalists for Cuba
Pan American Games silver medalists for Cuba
Pan American Games medalists in rowing
People from Sancti Spíritus
Rowers at the 2007 Pan American Games
Rowers at the 2011 Pan American Games
Rowers at the 2015 Pan American Games
Medalists at the 2007 Pan American Games
Medalists at the 2011 Pan American Games
Medalists at the 2015 Pan American Games